The Squamish Valley Music Festival (pronounced ), previously LIVE at Squamish, was an annual music festival co-produced by Vancouver-based BRANDLIVE Management group and Live Nation Canada, and held in Squamish, British Columbia, Canada, over the second weekend in August. Widely recognized as the largest and most exciting contemporary music festival in the Pacific Northwest region, with in excess of 120,000 people attending in 2015 alone. The festival was cancelled in 2016.

History 

The festival began in 2010, and has attracted headlining artists including Bad Religion, Metric, The Tragically Hip, Childish Gambino, Weezer, Matthew Good, City and Colour, Girl Talk, Vampire Weekend, Queens of the Stone Age, Eminem, Macklemore & Ryan Lewis, and Pretty Lights. The Festival features some of the biggest international names in the music industry today, alongside national and emerging regional talent, in an incredible experience highlighting artistry of all genres. The 2014 line up of over 70 artists included headliners Eminem, Arcade Fire, and Bruno Mars.  In 2015, the festival featured over 80 artists across four stages, led by the star-studded trio of headliners, Mumford & Sons, Drake, and Sam Smith.

In 2016, the festival's organizer's, BRANDLIVE and Live Nation Canada, canceled the event, due to a falling Canadian dollar and increasing competition from other music festival offerings.

2015 Festival

2014 Festival

2013 Festival

2012 Festival

2011 Festival

2010 Festival

References 

Music festivals in British Columbia
Music festivals established in 2010
Music festivals disestablished in 2016
2010 establishments in British Columbia
2016 disestablishments in British Columbia